The Engineering Institute of Technology (EIT) is a private college operating globally. Founded in 2008, with headquarters in Perth, Australia. EIT is a Registered Training Organisation (RTO) in the Vocational Education and Training Sector (VET) in Australia and is regulated by the Australian Skills Quality Authority (ASQA).

EIT is also a designated Higher Education Provider within Australia and is regulated by Tertiary Education Quality and Standards Agency (TEQSA). The college is registered to deliver a number of Bachelor of Science and master's degrees in the engineering and technology disciplines and a Doctor of Engineering.

History
The Engineering Institute of Technology (EIT) was founded as an affiliate of IDC Technologies by Dr. Stephen Mackay. Dr. Mackay is the institute's Dean of Engineering. After its founding, the college proceeded to offer live, online programs presented by industry-based lecturers who are sourced globally. The online EIT campus is accessed by students worldwide. In 2018 EIT opened two campuses in Australia, one in Western Australia, Perth and one in Victoria, Melbourne. The degree programs are offered on campus.

EIT’s headquarters were established in the Australian city of Perth, but subsequently offices have opened in Melbourne - on the east coast of Australia, in the United States, United Kingdom and South Africa. These offices are accessible to students worldwide.

During COVID-19 pandemic, in 2020, the Australian Government and EIT agreed to course funding for short courses in higher education, for Australian and New Zealand citizens.

Organization and Administration
The EIT Governance Board leads and guides EIT in the establishment, development, management, and maintenance of the strategies and corporate governing policies. It delegates decision-making authority to the managers and academic governing bodies. The EIT Academic Board provides guidance to the EIT Governance Board on the setting and maintenance of academic standards within EIT. It oversees the academic administration of EIT and develops policies relating to academic operations. Learning Support Officers, together with the lecturers, administer the different courses and provide direct support to EIT students.

Academics
EIT offers courses for professional development and Australian accredited qualifications in Engineering Management, Civil Engineering, Data Communications, and Industrial IT, Industrial Automation, Instrumentation and Process Control, Electrical Engineering, Electronic Engineering and Mechanical Engineering. The education offered by EIT is embedded in and driven by industry practice. EIT employs a synchronous learning and teaching platform with live, interactive webinars that allows students to interact with lecturers in real-time. Practical applications are accessed through EIT remote laboratories and simulation software.

An online invigilation software, IRIS, is used to uphold the academic integrity of EIT qualifications.

Facilities and Services

Libraries
EIT students have access to electronic libraries and information resources necessary to achieve the outcomes of their qualifications. EIT holds an Educational Copyright License and has a collection of white papers on engineering topics.

Awards 
The Engineering Institute of Technology has won the Western Australian International Education and Training Awards in 2015, in 2019 and in 2021. EIT won the overall national Australian International Education and Training Award in 2021.

In 2020, EIT was ranked first out of 55 Australian engineering faculties.

References

External links
 Official website

Universities in Western Australia
Technical universities and colleges in Australia
Engineering universities and colleges in Australia
2008 establishments in Australia